The Three Musketeers is a 1973 animated television special produced by the Australian division of Hanna-Barbera and a remake of the 1968 American Saturday morning cartoon The Three Musketeers, itself based on the 1844 novel of the same name by Alexander Dumas. It originally aired November 23, 1973 as part of Famous Classic Tales on CBS.

Plot  
The queen consort of France is falsely accused by Cardinal Richelieu of being involved in a plot to overthrow her husband the king of France. The King's Musketeers, Athos, Porthos, Aramis and a new recruit named D'Artagnan, attempt to solve the situation.

References

External links 
 
 

1970s American television specials
1973 television films
1973 films
Hanna-Barbera animated films
Hanna-Barbera television specials
Films based on The Three Musketeers
Films directed by William Hanna
Short films directed by Joseph Barbera
Films set in the 1620s
Films set in France
Films set in Paris
Animated films set in France
Animated films set in Paris
Television shows based on The Three Musketeers
1970s American films